Grunebaum is a last name, e.g.:

 Amos Grunebaum (born 1950), obstetrician and gynecologist
 Gustave E. von Grunebaum, an Austrian arabist
 Michael Grunebaum, an Israeli pediatrician

German-language surnames
Jewish surnames

de:Grunebaum